Meduka is a village in Gaurella-Pendra-Marwahi district in the state of Chhattisgarh, India.

Demographics 
In the 2011 Census of India, the population was 1,697. 828 were males and 869 were females.

See also 
 Gaurella-Pendra-Marwahi district

References 

Villages in Gaurella-Pendra-Marwahi district